L'École secondaire catholique régionale de Hawkesbury (ESCRH) is a French-Language Catholic high school located in Hawkesbury, Ontario. It is managed by the Conseil scolaire de district catholique de l'Est ontarien.

References

External links
 École secondaire catholique régionale de Hawkesbury

Catholic secondary schools in Ontario
French-language high schools in Ontario
Hawkesbury, Ontario
Education in the United Counties of Prescott and Russell